Hrvoje Hitrec (born 14 July 1943) is a Croatian writer, screenwriter, and politician. He is notable for his works for children and youth, most famous of his works being the novel (and later a very popular 1980s/90s TV series) Smogovci [hr], but Hitrec also wrote novels, film and TV scripts, dramas. He received several notable Croatian literary awards: "Ksaver Šandor Gjalski," "Ivana Brlić Mažuranić" and "Grigor Vitez."

Hitrec was also a close associate of Franjo Tuđman, the first President of Croatia and an early member of his nationalist Croatian Democratic Union (HDZ) party. In the early 1990s he served as director of the state broadcaster Croatian Radiotelevision, information minister in the government of Josip Manolić, and also a member of Croatian Parliament. 

Hitrec headed a right-wing independent list in the 2007 parliamentary elections. He identified himself as eurosceptic, and won 709 votes, or 0.26% of the vote in the VII district.

Works
 Jasenovac – istina, 2016, screenwriter
 "Humandel", Školska knjiga, Zagreb, 2007., 
 "Hrvatske legende", Školska knjiga, Zagreb, 2007., 
 "Kolarovi", Školska knjiga, Zagreb, 2004., 
 "Matko na štakama", Mosta, Zagreb, 2004., 
 "Gradsko kazalište Trešnja 1999.", Zagreb, 1999.
 "Zagreb: hrvatska prijestolnica", Zagreb, 1994.
 "Kanjon opasnih igara", Zagreb, 1994.
 "Ur", SF novel, Zagreb, 1982.
 "Eko Eko", Zagreb, 1979. i još 9 izdanja u Zagrebu i 2 u prijevodu
 "Smogovci: romančić za nešto stariju djecu i prilično mladu omladinu", Zagreb, 1976. i još 8 izdanja
 "Pustinjakov pupak", Zagreb, 1974.

See also 
 Jasenovac – istina

References

1943 births
Living people
Croatian dramatists and playwrights
Politicians from Zagreb
Croatian Democratic Union politicians
Representatives in the modern Croatian Parliament
Government ministers of Croatia
Croatian novelists
Croatian male writers
Yugoslav science fiction writers
Male novelists
Writers from Zagreb